Games played (most often abbreviated as G or GP) is a statistic used in team sports to indicate the total number of games in which a player has participated (in any capacity); the statistic is generally applied irrespective of whatever portion of the game is contested. In baseball, the statistic applies also to players who, prior to a game, are included on a starting lineup card or are announced as ex ante substitutes, whether or not they play; however, in Major League Baseball, the application of this statistic does not extend to consecutive games played streaks. A starting pitcher, then, may be credited with a game played even if he is not credited with a game started or an inning pitched. Shortstop, abbreviated SS, is a baseball or softball fielding position in the infield, commonly stationed between second and third base, which is considered to be among the most demanding defensive positions. The position is mostly filled by defensive specialists, so shortstops are generally relatively poor batters who typically hit lower in the batting order. In the numbering system used to record defensive plays, the shortstop is assigned the number 6.

Although there have been players with long careers at shortstop throughout major league history, they were more rare until the 1950s as expectations for their offensive contributions gradually increased. When batting expectations were lower, shortstops could be more easily replaced as their defensive ability declined by players with roughly equivalent hitting capability. 21 of the top 27 players in career games at shortstop made their major league debuts after 1950. Omar Vizquel is the all-time leader in games played as a shortstop, having played 2,709 games at the position in his career. 19 players in major league history have played over 2,000 career games at shortstop, the second most of all positions behind only first basemen.

Key

List

Stats updated through the 2022 season

Other Hall of Famers

Notes

References

External links

Major League Baseball statistics
Games played as a shortstop